South Holland is a local government district of Lincolnshire.  The district council is based in Spalding. Other notable towns include Crowland, Holbeach and Long Sutton. The district is named after the historical division of Lincolnshire known as the Parts of Holland.

It was formed on 1 April 1974, under the Local Government Act 1972, as a merger of the Spalding urban district with East Elloe Rural District and Spalding Rural District.  All these were previously in the administrative county of Holland.

South Holland is bordered by the borough of Boston to the north, The Wash and the county of Norfolk to the east, the county of Cambridgeshire and Peterborough unitary authority to the south, the Lincolnshire district of South Kesteven to the west, and the district of North Kesteven to the north-west.

Demographics

There were 76,512 citizens in the district at the 2001 census. The median age was nearly 43. 82.6% of people in the district claimed to adhere to a Christian religion – the highest proportion of any district in the East Midlands.

The 2011 census reports 88,270 people at 1.2 per hectare in 37,264 households.

Much of the district is low-lying and highly fertile agricultural land which is protected from flooding by land drainage. This is the responsibility of the South Holland Internal Drainage Board and the Environment Agency.

Arms

References

 
Non-metropolitan districts of Lincolnshire
Local government districts of the East Midlands